Anna Ramírez Bauxell (born 14 March 1981) is a Spanish racing cyclist, who rode professionally in road racing between 2014 and 2017. She won the Spanish National Road Race Championships in 2004 and 2014, and finished second on four other occasions.

Personal life
Ramírez and her sisters were raised vegetarian. For health reasons, she follows a vegan diet in her home and most of the time outside of it.

See also
 List of 2015 UCI Women's Teams and riders

References

External links
 
 

1981 births
Living people
Spanish female cyclists
Cyclists from Catalonia
People from Osona
Sportspeople from the Province of Barcelona
21st-century Spanish women